The following is a list of squads for each nation competing at the 2015 WBSC Premier12.

Group A

Manager: Víctor Mesa

Manager: Kuo Tai-yuan

Manager: Hensley Meulens

Manager: Ernie Whitt

Manager: Edwin Rodríguez

Manager: Marco Mazzieri

Group B

Manager: Hiroki Kokubo

Manager: Willie Randolph

Manager: Miguel Tejada

Manager: Kim In-sik

Manager: Luis Sojo

Manager: Mike Brito

References

External links
2015 WBSC PREMIER12™ TEAMS

Baseball tournament squads
WBSC Premier12